The men's freestyle 86 kg is a competition featured at the Golden Grand Prix Ivan Yarygin 2017, and was held in Krasnoyarsk, Russia on January  28.

Medalists

Results
Legend
F — Won by fall
D — Won by disqualification

Final

Top half

Bottom half

Repechage

References

Men's freestyle 86 kg